The Associated Society of Locomotive Engineers and Firemen (ASLEF) is a British trade union representing train drivers. It is part of the International Transport Workers' Federation and the European Transport Workers' Federation. At the end of 2018 ASLEF had 22,424 members. Its current General Secretary is Mick Whelan.

History

Foundation
In 1865, North Eastern Railway footplatemen founded a union called the Engine Drivers' and Firemen's Society. It unsuccessfully attempted strike action, as a result of which the NER was able to break up the Society.

In 1872, an industrial union, the Amalgamated Society of Railway Servants, was founded with the support of the Liberal MP Michael Bass. In 1872, the ASRS reported having 17,247 members, but by 1882, this had declined to only 6,321.

By the end of the 1870s, many UK railway companies had increased the working week from 60 to 66 hours, a 12-hour working day was common and wages had been reduced. The Great Western Railway had not increased wages since 1867, had increased the working day from 10 to 12 hours in 1878 and then reduced wages for all but the most junior drivers and firemen in 1879. In 1879, almost 2,000 GWR locomotive drivers and firemen signed an ASRS petition to the GWR Board of Directors requesting a restoration of the 1867 conditions of service and rates of pay. The GWR reacted by refusing to meet the ASRS representatives and dismissing several of the petitioners from their jobs.

As a result of this defeat, in 1879, drivers and firemen from Griffithstown, Pontypool, South Wales, started to organise to form a craft union separate from the ASRS. At the time there were similar moves in parts of England towards founding an enginemen's union. A large number of drivers and firemen met in Birmingham on 9 December 1879 and resolved to form a National Society of Drivers and Firemen. There was a similar move by Manchester, Sheffield and Lincolnshire Railway drivers and firemen at Sheffield, whom the Pontypool group called  "the first founders of the Society". The Sheffield branch opened on 7 February 1880 with William Ullyott, one of its leaders, as the first member. Pontypool branch followed on 15 February, led by Charles H. Perry, one of the drivers who had unsuccessfully petitioned the GWR board the previous year. ASLEF officially records Perry as its founder. In the remainder of 1880 ASLEF opened branches at Tondu, Liverpool and Leeds (April), Neath (May), Bradford (June), and Carnforth (July).

ASLEF adopted and published its first Rule Book in 1881. Its title page reproduced a stanza of Robert Burns' "Man was made to mourn: A Dirge":

If I'm yon haughty lordling's slave
By Nature's law designed,
Why was an independent wish
E'er planted in my mind?
If not, why am I subject to
His cruelty or scorn?
Or why has man the will and pow'r
To make his fellow mourn?

For economy's sake, ASLEF initially chose to be managed by its Leeds branch, as a result of which its first head office was at the Commercial Inn, Sweet Street, Holbeck. It moved to 17 Mill Hill Chambers, Leeds, in 1885, and again to 8 Park Square, Leeds, in 1904. In 1921, it moved to London by buying a house at 9 Arkwright Road, Hampstead, from the family of the late Sir Joseph Beecham, Bt. For a period in the second half of the 20th century ASLEF also owned the next-door house at 7 Arkwright Road.

Relations with industrial unionism
In the 1880s ASLEF's foundation as a craft union exclusively for one defined part of the railway workforce went against the industrial unionist trend of the New Unionism movement. In 1880, the ASRS denounced the enginemen's decision as "very selfish" and "an act of folly" and declared "the sooner our friends the enginemen... give up the idea of forming a separate Association the better".

ASLEF succeeded in getting more locomotive drivers and firemen to join a trade union, but it has never succeeded in recruiting all drivers or firemen. In 1900, the ASRS wanted amalgamation, but ASLEF proposed federation with the drivers and firemen of the ASRS. A Scheme of Federation was drafted and ASLEF's triennial conference adopted it in 1903. There were joint meetings of the Executive Committees of the two unions until 1906 when relations broke down.

In 1907, David Lloyd George, President of the Board of Trade, brought about a conciliation board for the railway industry with representatives of both the companies and their workforces. ASLEF initially welcomed the new board, but later grew dissatisfied with its slow operation and dubbed it a "confiscation" board. In August 1911, the ASRS, ASLEF, the United Pointsmen's and Signalmen's Society (founded 1880) and the General Railway Workers' Union (founded 1889) jointly called the United Kingdom's first national rail strike. In only two days it succeeded in forcing the Liberal Government to set up a Royal Commission to examine the workings of the 1907 conciliation board.

ASLEF's then General Secretary, Albert E. Fox, claimed that the 1911 victory showed there was no need to amalgamate with the ASRS and that Federation should be restored. Fox drafted a new federation scheme, but in October 1911, the ASRS rejected "the further extension of sectionalism contained therein" and expressed the opinion that the success of the national strike indicated "that one railway union will prove to be most beneficial for all railwaymen". In 1913, the ASRS, GRWU and UPSS duly merged to form the National Union of Railwaymen. ASLEF stayed out of the new industrial union and held to the slogan "organise your trade, federate your industry" coined by Fox.

During the First World War the cost of living increased rapidly. From July 1914 to September 1915, for example, food prices rose 37%. For the duration of the war, the government was in control of the railways. Wages were increased, but at a slower rate than the rise in the cost of living. NUR and ASLEF responded jointly, and forced the Board of Trade to award wage increases in September 1916 and April 1917. In March 1919, the coalition government indicated that it intended to review the War Wage, with a view to reducing it at the end of the year. The NUR and ASLEF started a second national railway strike in September 1919, which in nine days won both a change in pay policy and the reduction of the working day to eight hours.

After 1919, control of the railways was returned to the companies, and in 1923, the Railways Act 1921 merged about 120 of Great Britain's railways into four large regional companies. In December 1923, the new companies presented proposals that included some reductions in locomotive men's pay and conditions. Negotiations broke down and ASLEF ordered its members to strike, but the NUR instructed its members – including locomotivemen – to stay at work. After another nine-day strike, ASLEF was victorious, but the disagreement between ASLEF and the NUR left deep division.

Eventually ASLEF and the NUR agreed a new Railway Union Federation in 1982, but this failed to end mutual suspicion. About the time that the NUR and National Union of Seamen merged in 1990 to form the RMT the federation broke down, and neither federation nor merger has been negotiated since.

Major industrial disputes
ASLEF has taken part in several national rail strikes. The 1911 joint strike with the ASRS, 1919 joint strike with the NUR and 1924 strike of ASLEF without the NUR are described above. ASLEF and the NUR were prominent participants in the 1926 general strike that unsuccessfully sought to prevent British coal companies from reducing mineworkers' pay and conditions.

In 1955, ASLEF struck against British Railways for seventeen days in a pay dispute. In 1982, both ASLEF and the NUR opposed BR proposals for flexible rostering but they failed to co-ordinate strike action. First the NUR struck against BR and ASLEF instructed its members to cross NUR picket lines. Then after the end of the NUR's dispute, ASLEF held its own strike against BR.

There have also been local disputes with individual railway operators such as those with London Underground in 1982, 1989 and 1996.

Since railway privatisation

In the latter years of British Rail, train drivers were on a basic salary of around £12,000 per annum, supplemented by a set of enhancements for unsocial hours and overtime approximately £4,000–£5,000. Sunday had never formed part of the basic working week for train drivers in the UK, and was instead worked as overtime. Thus many drivers chose to work Sundays in order to make a better income. British Rail was run in all departments on an overtime culture to reduce overall wage bills resulting from having to employ extra staff to fill what would be uncovered vacancies. This approach had implications for fatigue and excessive hours, which partly contributed to the Clapham Junction rail crash in 1988.

From 1995 onwards, the Railways Act 1993 was implemented to privatise British Rail. In the first few years thereafter, ASLEF negotiated improved pay and conditions of service for its members from the new train operating companies.

Train drivers are now amongst the highest-paid associate professional (as defined by UK government) workers in the UK. ASLEF aims to increase basic pay so the "overtime culture" is reduced or eliminated, in the hope that more jobs will be created to cover the work that is not covered by overtime. The health and safety issues related to overtime and fatigue would also be minimised.

Membership
The record of membership numbers is not complete for all years of the society's history. However, some key years will give an indication of ASLEF's growth in its first seven decades.

 1881: 651
 1889: 5,039
 1892: 6,710
 1894: 7,524
 1901: 10,502
 1908: 19,800
 1910: 19,800
 1913: 32,200
 1916: 34,039
 1918: 39,940
 1919: 57,184
 1937: 53,857
 1939: 53,325
 1946: 71,842
 2011: 18,500+
 2014: 20,364
 2017: 21,791

Political affiliation
ASLEF is affiliated to the Labour Party.

Labour was founded in 1900 as the Labour Representation Committee, and in 1903, ASLEF voted to affiliate to it. In the 1906 general election, ASLEF General Secretary Albert Fox was the LRC candidate for Leeds South, where he polled 4,030 votes. Fox lost to the Liberal incumbent John Lawson Walton, but Lawson Walton died in January 1908 causing a by-election. Fox contested Leeds South a second time, but lost to the new Liberal candidate William Middlebrook.

In June 2015, ASLEF endorsed Jeremy Corbyn's campaign in the Labour Party leadership election. Aslef said Corbyn has the "character, vision and policies" needed to win back power for the party. General secretary Mick Whelan said: "Jeremy understands what Labour has to do to win back the hearts, the minds and the votes of ordinary working people in Britain."

Election results
The union sponsored a Labour Party candidate in many Parliamentary elections, from 1906 until 1992. Several of its candidates were elected as Members of Parliament.

Leadership

General Secretaries
1880: Joseph Brooke
1885: Thomas Sunter
1901: Albert E. Fox
1914: Jack Bromley
1936: Richard Squance
1940: William P. Allen
1948: Jim Baty
1956: Albert Hallworth
1960: William Evans
1964: Albert Griffiths
1970: Ray Buckton
1987: Neil Milligan
1990: Derrick Fullick
1993: Lew Adams
1998: Mick Rix
2003: Shaun Brady
2004: Keith Norman
2011: Mick Whelan

Assistant General Secretaries

1891: Henry Shuttleworth
1910: George Moore
1927: Richard Squance
1936: William P. Allen
1939: Percy Collick
1946: Jim Baty (acting)
1948: Albert Hallworth (acting)
1956: William Evans
1960: Albert Griffiths
1963: Ray Buckton
1970: Don Pullen
1985: Neil Milligan
1987: Derrick Fullick
1990: Lew Adams
1994: Tony West
2000: Mick Blackburn
2004: Post abolished
2015: Simon Weller

Presidents
1881: George Bamforth
1882: Henry Shuttleworth
1883: Samuel Holland
1880s: Henry Shuttleworth
1891: Moses John Dickinson
1893: Henry Parfitt
1896:
1900: Albert E. Fox
1902: J. A. Hawkins

1907: George Moore
1910:
1913: George Wride
1915: John Hunter
1917: George Wride
1918: Worthy Cooke
1919: W. A. Stephenson
1920: Richard Squance
1921:
1930: William P. Allen
1934:
1940s: Ted Bidwell
1948: P. McGubbin
1952: Frederick Kelland
1954: N. A. Pinches
1958: Jack Simons
1963: Albert Atkinson
1965: Les Kirk
1968: George Thomas
1972: Les Feltham
1974: Bill Ronksley
1982: Derrick Fullick
1990: Willie O'Brien
1995: Clive Jones
1996: William Mackenzie
2000: David Tyson, Sean Madden, 
2000: Martin Samways
2004: David Tyson
2005: Alan Donnelly
2015: Tosh McDonald
2019: Dave Calfe

See also

 Associated Society of Locomotive Engineers and Firemen v United Kingdom (2007)

References

Sources and further reading

External links
 
 Certification Officer: ASLEF accounts
 Trade Union Ancestors: ASLEF
 British & Irish Legal Information Institute: Trumm v Norman
 Catalogue of the ASLEF archives, held at the Modern Records Centre, University of Warwick

 
1880 establishments in the United Kingdom
International Transport Workers' Federation
Railway unions in the United Kingdom
Trade unions affiliated with the Labour Party (UK)
Trade unions established in 1880
Trade unions in the United Kingdom
Trade unions based in London
Trade unions affiliated with the Trades Union Congress